Mak Yong (Jawi: مق يوڠ;) is a traditional form of dance-drama from northern Malaysia, particularly the state of Kelantan. It was banned by the Pan-Malaysian Islamic Party because of its animist and Hindu-Buddhist roots which pre-date Islam in the Asian region by far. The late Cik Ning was a leading Mak Yong performer in the 1980s. In 2005, UNESCO declared Mak Yong theatre a "Masterpieces of the Oral and Intangible Heritage of Humanity". 

Mak Yong is considered the most authentic and representative of Malay performing arts because it is mostly untouched by external sources. Although most traditional Malay dances were influenced by India, Java and other parts of Southeast Asia, Mak Yongs singing and musical repertoire are unique. Of the major stories performed in Mak Yong, most are derived from Kelantan-Patani mythology. Some of those obtained from outside the Malayan-Thai region have now died out elsewhere such as Anak Raja Gondang, a story originally from the Buddhist Jataka tales but now almost unknown in India.

A performance begins by paying respect to the spirits (semah kumpung) with an offering. This is followed by dancing, acting, and improvised dialogues. Stories were presented in a series of three-hour performances over several nights. The lead dancer is called the Pak Yong and dresses like a king. The cast usually includes a queen in second lead, palace girls, and jesters. Traditionally, all performers were female except for the clowns who are always male. A group called Jong Dongdang sings and dances in between chapters and at the story's closing. The Mak Yong orchestra is small with the main instruments played being the three-stringed spiked lute, drum (gendang), and a pair of gong. It may also include the flute (serunai), keduk drums and small cymbals (kesi).

Today there is less than ten veterans Mak Yong performers. Although there have been a few attempts to revive the art form, seasoned performers have noted a clear difference between the commercialized Mak Yong of urban dancers when compared with the movements of rural performers. Not many young people are willing to undergo the rigorous apprenticeship so the art is now on the decline.

History
Mak Yong was originally a form of folk theatre involving rituals connected with propitiation as well as healing. It is believed to have come into being in the Pattani Kingdom, which is now a province of Thailand. Because it was passed down orally among villagers, Mak Yong'''s exact age is uncertain. However, the fact that it is mostly free of outside influence would make it 800 years old at the very least and almost certainly much older. Legend generally credits the dance to a rice spirit called Mak Hiang but a later belief tells that it was created by the Javanese clown-like divinity, Semar. Certain observers connected Mak Yong with the palace, especially in Patani, but there is no evidence for this. It was patronized by all layers of society to pay respect to spirits, give thanks for the harvest, or to cure a person of various illnesses. 

Mak Yong was brought to Kelantan more than 200 years ago. From there, it also spread to Kedah and existed as folk theatre.  From the 1920s, some support was given to Mak Yong in Kelantan and attempts were made to refine it. In 1923, the king's youngest son, Long Abdul Ghaffar, was in favour of Mak Yong and built a cultural precinct called Kampung Temenggung on his palace grounds to lend his support to the arts. During this time, it became conventional to have a lead female. His death in 1935 was followed by World War II. Mak Yong once again became a folk tradition. In the 1970s, an attempt was made to create a refined version of Mak Yong, supposedly carrying on the efforts of Long Abdul Ghaffar. For this purpose, a group called Seri Temenggong was established under Khatijah Awang. Performances were done in major towns and cities, and Mak Yong also found a place in academic institutions. 

The traditional Mak Yong continued into the 1960s and 70s but was later impeded by the Islamic revival. When PAS took control of Kelantan in 1991, they banned Mak Yong in the state for its "un-Islamic elements" and clothing, which leaves women's heads and arms uncovered. Although many old performers defied the ban, Mak Yong could no longer be shown in public. Some thought the tradition would die out until UNESCO declared it as one of the intangible cultural heritages that should be preserved. There has since been some effort to perform Mak Yong outside Kelantan but interest among the younger generation is lacking.

Nowadays, Mak Yong is seldom performed as priority is often given to modern Malays ethnic group dances like joget. It is sometimes still staged to mark state events as well as for tourists. However, these modern shortened performances are stripped of the old animist rituals and their music is simplified because the songs are played so infrequently. There are only a few troupes left who perform traditionally Mak Yong in the villages of Kelantan and Terengganu.

Ritual performance
As with many other ancient Malay forms of theatre, Mak Yong was once used for healing purposes. Healing Mak Yong is called Mak Yong Mak Puteri and involves trance dancing and spirit possession through the use of the traditional healing ritual called Main Puteri. These healing rituals are still practiced in the villages as well as in some more traditional cities but they are largely frowned upon today.

Ritual performances are more elaborate than those staged for entertainment, combining shamanism, feasting the spirits, and dance theatre. It reflects the deep, mystical significance of Mak Yongs stories and dances and its original aim to serve as a conduit to the spirit world. Ritual performances are enacted for spiritual healing, to pay homage to a teacher and for the graduation of a performer.

Indonesia

In Indonesia, Mak Yong performance found in Riau and North Sumatra, spread from South Thailand via Singapore. In the Riau Islands, mak yong is performed in Batam and Bintan, by groups from Pulau Panjang, Kecamatan Kijang and Pulau Mantang Arang.

Thailand
Mak Yong was also widely spread in Patani, former Pattani city during the Pattani Kingdom era and it is still being practiced in several locations, such as Yala.https://doi.org/10.37134/juraisembah.vol1.2.1.2020 

See also

 Bangsawan Kuda Kepang Reog Sanghyang Wayang Ulek Mayang''

References

Further reading
Ghulam-Sarwar Yousof. "The Kelantan Mak Yong Dance Theatre: A Study of Performance Structure". PhD Dissertation, University of Hawai'i, Honolulu, 1976.

Ghulam-Sarwar Yousof. Mak Yong: World Heritage Theatre.Penang, Malaysia: Areca Books,2019.
 
The Basics of Kelantan Drums in Mak Yong by Yap Eng Sim

Malay culture
Malay dances
Masterpieces of the Oral and Intangible Heritage of Humanity
Dances of Malaysia
Dances of Indonesia
Dances of Sumatra
Theatre in Indonesia
Traditional drama and theatre of Indonesia